Smith and the Pharaohs, and Other Tales is a collection of stories by H. Rider Haggard. The title story was serialized in Strand Magazine, between December 1912 and February 1913. Others in the collection included:
"Magepa the Buck" – an Allan Quatermain short story
"The Blue Curtains"
"Little Flower"
"Only a Dream"
"Barbara Who Came Back"

References

External links
Complete book at Project Gutenberg

Novels by H. Rider Haggard
Human-mummy romance in fiction
1921 short story collections